"Rockin' That Shit" (clean titled "Rockin' That Thang") is the first single from The-Dream's second studio album, Love vs. Money. The song features production by Tricky Stewart.

Release
The song was digitally released on December 9, 2008. It was released to Rhythm/Crossover radio on the same day.

Music video

The music video was shot on January 27, 2009, with director Ray Kay, and released on February 10, 2009. A music video supporting The-Dream's track "Rockin' That Thang", which is explicitly titled "Rockin' That S***", has been released. Directed by Ray Kay, the video mainly captures his performance with several sexy women dancing behind him. The members of Electrik Red are also featured as dancers in parts of the video and Nash appears to wear a thriller jacket.

It ranked at #14 on BET's Notarized: Top 100 Videos of 2009 countdown.

Remix
The official remix featuring Fabolous, Ludacris, Rick Ross, Juelz Santana and an intro from DJ Khaled. It was released via iTunes on February 17, 2009. The music video was shot in New York City on February 12, 2009, and premiered on Yahoo! Music on Monday, March 9, 2009. The video also premiered March 16 on BET's "106 & Park", alongside singer Paula DeAnda.

Other remixes
Rockin' That Thang (featuring Busta Rhymes & Fabolous)
Rockin' That Thang (featuring N.O.R.E.)
Rockin' That Thang (featuring Freeway)
Rockin' That Thang (Trey Songz freestyle)
Rockin' That Shit (featuring Jamie Foxx)
Rockin' That Shit (featuring T.I.)
She Coppin' That Thang" (Rock City freestyle)

Chart positions

Weekly charts

End of year charts

References

External links
 The-Dream MySpace
 Official Def Jam website
 Radio Killa Records
 Rockin’ That Thang (lyrics , video)

2008 singles
The-Dream songs
Music videos directed by Ray Kay
Songs written by The-Dream
2008 songs
Song recordings produced by The-Dream
Song recordings produced by Tricky Stewart
Def Jam Recordings singles